Koda or KODA may refer to:

People
Cub Koda (1948–2000), American rock and roll songwriter, singer, guitarist, disc jockey, music critic and record compiler
Geeta Koda (born ca. 1983), Indian politician
Gjon Koda (born 1893), Albanian friar, one of the 38 Blessed Martyrs of Albania
Harold Koda (born 1950), American fashion scholar
Madhu Koda (born 1971), Indian Chief Minister of the State of Jharkhand
Kōda, often spelled Koda or Kouda, a common Japanese surname
Aya Kōda (1904–1990), Japanese essayist and novelist
Gakuto Coda (born 1977), Japanese light novelist
Isao Koda (born 1965), Japanese baseball pitcher
Hiroyuki Koda (1944–1997), director of the US Yoshukai Karate Association 1979-1997
Kaho Kōda (born 1967), Japanese voice actress
Koda Kumi (born 1982), Japanese pop singer
Kuniko Koda (born 1965), Japanese politician
Kōda Rohan, pen name of Japanese author Kōda Shigeyuki (1867–1947)
Masakazu Koda (born 1969), Japanese soccer player
Mariko Kouda (born 1969), Japanese voice actress and J-Pop singer
Naoko Kouda, stage name of Japanese voice actress Yumiko Satō (born 1959)
Nobu Kōda (1870–1946), Japanese composer, violinist, and music teacher
Shosei Koda (1979–2004), Japanese tourist who was beheaded in Iraq
Kōda, fictional family in the Manpuku Japanese TV drama series (2018–) 
Koda Glover (born 1993), American baseball pitcher
Koda Martin (born 1995), American football player
KODA (singer), Ghanaian gospel singer Kofi Owusu Dua Anto (born 1978)

Places
Kōda Station (disambiguation), three train stations in Japan
Koda Dam, in Miyagi Prefecture, Japan
Kōda, former Japanese town, merged into Akitakata, Hiroshima in 2004
Kōda, former Japanese town, merged into Kōta, Aichi in 1955
Koda, or Koda-cho, a district (cho) of Tahara, Aichi Japan
Koda River, the Japanese name of the Hutuo River (China), in the Linji school of Buddhism
Koda River (D. R. Congo), also spelled Kodda or Kodha, in Ituri province
Kōda River (Aichi), Japan; also called Kōta like the town
Kōda River (Kōchi), Japan; "Kanda" in some English sources
Koda (Russia), a tributary of the Angara in Krasnoyarsk Krai, Russia
Koda River (South Sudan), in Jubek State

Other uses
KODA, an FM radio station licensed to Houston, Texas, United States
KODA, prefix of the KLAT AM radio station in Houston, Texas, until 1979
KODA (Denmark), the collecting society for songwriters, composers and music publishers of Denmark
KODA (Kid Of Deaf Adult), an acronym sometimes used to refer to a Child Of Deaf Adult (CODA) under the age of 18
Koda, a character in the Disney Brother Bear movies.
Koda (Power Rangers Dino Charge), a character in the television series Power Rangers Dino Charge
Koda Farms, a family-owned rice producer in California
Koda language, spoken in India and Bangladesh
Koda millet or Kodo millet, Paspalum scrobiculatum
Koda tree, Ehretia acuminata, from China, Japan, New Guinea and Australia
KODA Finance, a finance company in the UK

See also
Koda Jahanabad or Kora Jahanabad, town in Fatehpur district, Uttar Pradesh, India
Maavalla Koda, a religious organization in Estonia
Thumbida Koda, a 1964 Kannada language film from India
Choda (also known as Koda), an ancient Indian tribal group
Coda (disambiguation)
Alternative transliterations of "Koda" for place names in India:
Kora (disambiguation)
Korha (disambiguation)
Korra (disambiguation)
Khori (disambiguation)
Khora

Japanese-language surnames